Löwenthal is a surname of Germanic language origin.

Notable people with this name include:
 Gerhard Löwenthal (1922–2002), a German journalist
 Johann Löwenthal (1810–1876), a Hungarian Jewish chess player
 Leo Löwenthal (1900–1993), a German sociologist
 Richard Löwenthal (1908–1991), a German journalist

A variant is Lowenthal:
Abe Lowenthal (b. 1941), American political scientist, founding director of the Wilson Center's Latin American Program. Professor of ethics, globalization and development and also professor of international relations at the University of Southern California (USC).  He is president emeritus and a senior fellow of the Pacific Council on International Policy, of which he was the founding president from 1995-2005.
 Alan Lowenthal (born 1941), US Representative
 Bill Lowenthal (1909-1989), an Australian rules footballer
 David Lowenthal (1923–2018), American-born British geographer and historian, son of Max, brother of John
 Jerome Lowenthal (born 1932), an American classical pianist
 John Lowenthal (1925-2003), American law professor, lifelong defender of Alger Hiss, son of Max, brother of David
 Margaret Lowenthal (1929-2003), an American politician and US Representative
 Max Lowenthal (1888–1971), American lawyer, longtime associate of Harry S. Truman, father of John and David
 Yuri Lowenthal (born 1971), an American voice actor

See also 
 Löwenthal's method, a method of titration of tannin

German-language surnames
Jewish surnames
Yiddish-language surnames
Surnames from ornamental names